Robot Chicken DC Comics Special is an episode of the television comedy series Robot Chicken and it was aired as a one-off special during Cartoon Network's Adult Swim on September 10, 2012.

A DC Universe special, in collaboration with DC Entertainment and Warner Bros. Animation. Voice actors are Seth Green as Batman, Robin and Aquaman, Paul Reubens as the Riddler, Neil Patrick Harris as Two-Face, Alfred Molina as Lex Luthor, Nathan Fillion as the Green Lantern, Megan Fox as Lois Lane, Breckin Meyer as Superman, and Kevin Shinick as the narrator. Cast also includes Abraham Benrubi, Alex Borstein, Clare Grant, Tara Strong, Matthew Senreich, Aaron Paul, Steven Tyler, Tom Root, and Zeb Wells. It was followed by the Robot Chicken DC Comics Special 2: Villains in Paradise, which premiered April 6, 2014.

Voice cast
 Abraham Benrubi as Cyborg, Kilowog, Appa Ali Apsa, and Solomon Grundy
 Alex Borstein as Wonder Woman, Giganta, and Woman at Bar
 Nathan Fillion as Green Lantern and Mr. Freeze
 Megan Fox as Lois Lane
 Clare Grant as Cheetah, Ice, and Abby Holland
 Seth Green as The Nerd, Batman, Robin, Aquaman, The Penguin, Little Cheese, Martian Manhunter, Toyman, Green Arrow, Scarecrow, Abin Sur, Ganthet, Gorilla Grodd, Hawkman, Jimmy Olsen, Various 
 Neil Patrick Harris as Two-Face and Black Manta
 Breckin Meyer as Superman and Mirror Master
 Alfred Molina as Lex Luthor, Firestorm, and Mister Banjo
 Aaron Paul as Glenn and The Joker (Deleted Scene)
 Paul Reubens as The Riddler and Deadman (Deleted Scene)
 Tom Root as Icicle and B'dg
 Kevin Shinick as Narrator and Captain Cold
 Matthew Senreich as The Flash, Brainiac, Wildcat, and Chillblaine
 Tara Strong as Harley Quinn and Selena Gomez
 Steven Tyler as Singer (uncredited)
 Zeb Wells as Sinestro and Swamp Thing

Writers
 Matthew Beans
 Mike Fasolo
 Douglas Goldstein
 Seth Green
 Geoff Johns
 Breckin Meyer
 Tom Root
 Matthew Senreich
 Kevin Shinick
 Zeb Wells

Synopsis
List of sketches
 RCDC – Robot Chicken joins forces with DC Comics superheroes and supervillains. 
 You Can't Fly – Superman, Green Lantern, and Wonder Woman have a laugh at Aquaman's expense. 
 That's Bane! – While staking out a robbery, Batman has his back broken by Bane. 
 Real DC Characters – Meet B'dg, a squirrel who's a member of the Green Lantern Corps.
 The Super Kiss – Parody of the scene in Superman II where Superman kisses Lois Lane to make her forget he's Superman. He decides to use his kissnesia on his enemies to make them forget why they hate him, but it backfires on him when they show up at the Fortress of Solitude with flowers and candy. 
 Two-Face's OCD – Two-Face cannot stop flipping his coin to make decisions, even when he goes to the bathroom. 
 Cold Villains – Mr. Freeze, Captain Cold, Icicle, and Chillblaine all rob a jewelry auction, causing a problem between the four cold-themed villains. 
 Funeral in Earth-C – Superman invites Batman and Green Lantern to Captain Carrot's funeral in Earth-C, but Green Lantern can't help himself from laughing at the other members of the Zoo Crew, causing him to abruptly leave. After Little Cheese comments on Green Lantern's insensitive behavior, Batman begins to snicker at his name. 
 Swamp Thing – Swamp Thing tries to get his girlfriend to understand his powers. 
 That's Bane! Again! – While recovering in the Batcave, Bane sneaks up on Batman and breaks his back over his knee again. 
 Real DC Characters 2 – Meet Firestorm, a "popular" and powerful superhero. 
 Out to Score – Batman, Superman, Aquaman, Green Lantern, and The Flash hit the bar scene to pick up some ladies. But when Superman and Green Lantern strike out, Aquaman tries to pick up a woman who turns out to be Martian Manhunter in disguise, causing him to go home, get drunk and try to have sex with a dolphin. 
 Doom Secret Santa – At the Legion of Doom's HQ, the legion members draw names for secret Santa. But when the smelly mailman, Glenn comes in, they all stop talking, while Glenn shouts at them that he showers every day. Glenn then kills himself during the commercial break. 
 Nerd Lantern – Instead of Hal Jordan, the Robot Chicken Nerd ends up finding Abin Sur and receiving his ring instead. When he is taken to Oa and begins his training with Kilowog, the Guardians begin to doubt if humans are worthy of a power ring. Meanwhile on Earth, Abin Sur's corpse is eaten by bears. 
 Luthor's Warsuit – Lex Luthor steps into the perfect Superman-killing machine until the scientist's son kicks a ball that hits Lex in the face. 
 That Tickles – A criminal shoots Superman, but when he notices the bullets are bouncing off, he fires at his crotch, which continues to deflect the bullets, much to Superman's confusion. 
 The Punctuation Posse – Riddler forms the Punctuation Posse, which consists of Comma, Quotes, and Exclaimer, which is quickly beaten up by the Justice League and Legion of Doom. 
 That's Bane! Thrice! – At the Hall of Justice, Bane sneaks up on Batman and breaks his back over his knee once again while Superman, Wonder Woman, Flash, and Green Lantern watch. 
 Sinestro's Final Moment – In the Legion of Doom bathroom, Riddler and Mirror Master tease Sinestro into shaving his mustache, but as soon as the razor touches his lip, it starts gushing blood, causing Riddler and Mirror Master to run off in disgust. 
 That Is It – Aquaman's had enough of the lack of respect after Superman and Wonder Woman both mock his powers, Robin uses his trident to unclog the toilet, Martian Manhunter cooks his lobster friends, and he slips on a puddle and gets mocked by the other heroes. 
 Real DC Characters 3 – Meet Mister Banjo, a supervillain. Suddenly, an enraged Firestorm bursts in and refuses to be in the same category as him and uses his powers to turn the banjo into metal and then beats Mister Banjo and B'dg with it. 
 Aqua Doom – Aquaman visits the Legion of Doom HQ and asks to join. At first, they refuse. But when he tells them he's got security access codes to the Hall of Justice, they let him on the team. 
 Solomon Grundy – Solomon Grundy finds out he was actually born on a Tuesday and that his real name is Solomon Gruesday, much to his anger.
 Aquaman Appreciation Party – Aquaman leads the Legion of Doom into the Hall of Justice in a Trojan cake, where the heroes are revealed to have thrown Aquaman a party. After Aquaman cuts into the cake, the Legion of Doom is revealed, leading to an epic final battle between the Justice League and the Legion of Doom that ends with all of them attending Glenn's funeral.

Recurring segments and subplots
Certain segments recurred throughout the special including "That's Bane!" (where Bane sneaks up behind Batman and breaks his back) and "Real Characters from the DC Universe" (featuring characters you wouldn't suspect exist in the DC Universe) as well as subplots including Glenn from the Hall of Doom's mailroom and Aquaman's turn from being part of the Justice League of America to joining the Legion of Doom, plus Lex Luthor getting hit in the head by a kickball.

Home media
Robot Chicken DC Comics Special was released on DVD and Blu-ray, on July 9, 2013.

Sources and influences 
The logo for the Robot Chicken DC Comics Special is a modification of that for the Super Powers Collection.

The opening sequence of the special parodies that of the Challenge of the Super Friends albeit with the Legion of Doom substituted with Robot Chicken original characters Chicken, Mad Scientist, Nerd, Humping Robot, Composite Santa, Gummy Bear, the Unicorn, and Bitch Puddin'.

Most of the figures used for the special are from the Mego World's Greatest Superheroes!, Mattel DC Universe Classics, and EMCE Toys/Mattel DC Retro Action Superheroes toylines. Brainiac and Lex Luthor would see both DC Universe Classics and DC Retro Action Superheroes versions (though, of course, the DC Retro Action Superheroes Brainiac figure was an original piece).

The graphic for the "Real Characters from the DC Universe" is very similar to the Challenge of the Super Friends title graphic.

The Hall of Justice is from the Super Powers Collection but is white rather than yellow to be in line with its appearance in Super Friends.

The use of Mister Freeze, Captain Cold, Icicle, and Chillblaine as a group of cold-themed villains is an ongoing theme from DC Comics seeing previous versions including a team-up by Captain Cold, Icicle, and Minister Blizzard in Justice League of America #139 (February 1977), the Cold Warriors in Justice League Adventures #12 (December 2002), the Ice Pack in Super Friends #16 (August 2009), and Icicle, Icicle Jr, Mr. Freeze, Captain Cold, and Killer Frost in Young Justice "Terrors".

Notes

References

External links
 

2010s English-language films
2010s superhero comedy films
Animated films based on DC Comics
2012 television films
Justice League in other media
Television episodes written by Geoff Johns
Animated superhero comedy films
2010s American animated films
Television episodes directed by Seth Green